Eugen Anton Bolz (15 December 1881 – 23 January 1945) was a German politician and a member of the resistance to the Nazi régime.

Life 
Born in Rottenburg am Neckar, Bolz was his parents' twelfth child. His father Joseph Bolz was a salesman. His mother was Maria Theresia Bolz (née Huber). He married Maria Hoeness from Ulm in 1920 and they had one daughter. Through his wife's family, Bolz was the uncle of Cardinal Paul Augustin Mayer (1911–2010).

Career 
Bolz took his Abitur in 1900 at the Karls-Gymnasium in Stuttgart. He was involved in the Windthorstbund, the youth organization of the Centre Party.

From 1900, he studied law at the University of Tübingen and at the universities of Bonn (1901) and Berlin (1901–02). He became a member of the Catholic student associations AV Guestfalia Tübingen, the KDStV Bavaria Bonn and the KAV Suevia Berlin, all in the CV. At the KAV Suevia Berlin he met the centre politician Felix Porsch who caused him to become a politician after graduation. In 1902, he continued his studies in Tübingen and graduated in 1905 from the first state examination. He then completed the traineeship in Rottenburg, Ravensburg and Stuttgart. After Bolz had passed second state examination in 1909, he worked as a laborer at the prosecution of Ulm. From 1911 to 1914, he worked as an assessor at the Stuttgart prosecution. During World War I he served as lieutenant in the Western Front in Alsace Not long after finishing his studies in Bonn and Berlin, he latched onto politics as a career and joined the Centre Party, which he represented in the Reichstag from 1912 to 1933, and from 1915 to 1933, also in the Württemberg Landtag. In Württemberg, he became Justice Minister in 1919 and Interior Minister in 1923.

At the time when the National Socialists seized power in 1933, Bolz was Württemberg's Staatspräsident – the first Catholic to hold the position in predominantly Protestant Württemberg – and also Interior Minister. Since he was an adherent of Catholic social teaching, which made no secret of its loathing for the Nazis, it was no surprise that Bolz was one of the new régime's greatest opponents. Owing to this, he was forced from office early in 1933 and wound up spending several weeks in a concentration camp. Led by the party whip, Bolz's party approved the new Ermächtigungsgesetz ("Enabling Act") on 23 March 1933, even though it weighed heavily on their conscience.

After being released from the concentration camp, Bolz moved back to Beuron, near Ulm. There, he forswore politics for a while, busying himself mainly with economic issues, papal social encyclicals, and Catholic Action. During this time of involuntary retirement, he sometimes did work as a tax advisor, and he always knew that the Gestapo were watching him.

In late 1941 and early 1942, he came into contact with the resistance circle about Carl Friedrich Goerdeler. Bolz readily declared that he would like to take over a ministerial post in the new government after Hitler was overthrown. Goerdeler put him down as Culture Minister in the cabinet that he foresaw having to put together. Among other things, this would have meant that Bolz would be taking Goebbels's place.

However, on 20 July 1944, Goerdeler's plan fell apart when Claus von Stauffenberg's attempt to kill Hitler at the Wolf's Lair in East Prussia failed. Bolz was arrested on 12 August 1944, and on 21 December, he was sentenced to death at the German "People's Court" (Volksgerichtshof). He was beheaded at Plötzensee Prison in Berlin on 23 January 1945.

There is a memorial to Eugen Bolz in the form of a bronze plaque at the house where he was born, at Königstraße 53 in Rottenburg am Neckar. It bears, among other things, the Latin inscription "TIMOR DOMINI INITIUM SAPIENTIAE" — "The fear of the Lord is the beginning of wisdom". The grammar school that he went to is now called the Eugen-Bolz-Gymnasium. A Catholic private school in Bad Waldsee and a Realschule in Ellwangen – both in Baden-Württemberg – are also named for him. One of the sitting rooms at the Baden-Württemberg Landtag is named after him. In downtown Stuttgart, at the Königsbau, stands a monument to Eugen Bolz.

In 2004, a new bell at the church where Bolz was baptized, St. Moriz in Rottenburg am Neckar, was named after him. Many other buildings, streets and squares in Germany are likewise connected with the name Eugen Bolz.

Eugen Bolz Study Endowment 
Since 1994, there has been an "Eugen Bolz Study Endowment" (Studienstiftung Eugen Bolz). This endowment is for study and education, and is closely associated with the Cartellverband der katholischen deutschen Studentenverbindungen (CV). It affords students an education in democracy and civics.

Quotes 
 "Politics is nothing other than practically applied religion."
 "Given the Nazis' reign of terror, I demanded that God's law stand above state law."

Literature 
 Christentum und Politik. Dokumente des Widerstands by Joachim Köhler, 1996 Thorbecke-Verlag Sigmaringen, 
 Eugen Bolz und die Krise des politischen Katholizismus in der Weimarer Republik by Joachim Sailer, bibliotheca academica Verlag, 
 "Eugen Bolz (1881–1945)" by Rudolf Morsey, in: Jürgen Aretz / Anton Rauscher (Hg.), Zeitgeschichte in Lebensbildern, Bd. 5, Mainz 1982
 "Eugen Bolz. Württembergischer Minister und Staatspräsident" by Joachim Köhler, in: Michael Bosch / Wolfgang Niess (Hg.), Der Widerstand im deutschen Südwesten 1933–1945, Stuttgart 1984
 Eugen Bolz by Max Miller, 1951 Schwabenverlag
 Staatspräsident Dr. Eugen Bolz als Mann u. Staatsmann by Alois Dangelmaier, 1948 Schwabenverlag
 Leben und Martyrium unseres Staatspräsidenten Dr. Eugen Bolz by Wilhelm Kohler, 1947 Ackermann Verlag
 
 Helmut Moll, (Hrsg. im Auftrag der Deutschen Bischofskonferenz), Zeugen für Chritus. Das deutsche Martyrologium des 20. Jahrhunderts, 6. erweiterte und neu strukturierte Auflage, Paderborn u.a. 2015, Band I, 659–663.
 Frank Raberg: Eugen Bolz. Zwischen Pflicht und Widerstand. DRW-Verlag Weinbrenner, Leinfelden-Echterdingen 2009, .
 Joachim Sailer: Eugen Bolz und die Krise des politischen Katholizismus in der Weimarer Republik. bibliotheca academica Verlag, Tübingen 1994, .

References 

Sources
Brief biography of Eugen Bolz
Eugen Bolz's activities (scroll down to page 7)

External links 

 Documentation about Eugen Bolz (from a project at the Eugen-Bolz-Gymnasium, Rottenburg)
 
 Image of Eugen Bolz' eulogy, ZIP file (in German)
 German Resistance Museum, Berlin, page on Bolz (in English)

1881 births
1945 deaths
People from Rottenburg am Neckar
People from the Kingdom of Württemberg
German Roman Catholics
Centre Party (Germany) politicians
Members of the 13th Reichstag of the German Empire
Members of the Weimar National Assembly
Members of the Reichstag of the Weimar Republic
Executed members of the 20 July plot
People from Baden-Württemberg executed at Plötzensee Prison
German resistance members
Roman Catholics in the German Resistance
Executed presidents
People executed by guillotine at Plötzensee Prison
People condemned by Nazi courts
Members of the Württembergian Chamber of Deputies
Cartellverband members
University of Tübingen alumni
Executed German people